Acineta barkeri is a species of orchid found from Mexico to Guatemala.

References

External links
 
 

barkeri
Orchids of Guatemala
Orchids of Mexico